CBS Europa (formerly Zone Europa, Europa Europa, Le Cinema and Wizja Le Cinema) is a Polish film channel. It broadcasts contemporary films, influential classics, acclaimed favourites and avant-garde productions.

Distributors including Universal Studios, Film4 Productions, the British Film Institute, M6 and Sogepaq contribute the independent productions to the channel.

Zone Europa's 14-hour schedule was extended to 20 hours at weekends. The channel was originally available in 15 territories across Europe and The Americas by over 6.6 million subscribers. Spanish language content was also available to Comcast On Demand en Espanol in the United States.

A Hungarian version of the channel was launched in 2004, as an extension of the Polish channel, but it closed on 1 May 2009 because the channel was not popular by the Hungarian advertisers.

On 1 August 2012 Chellomedia revealed that all European versions of the Zone Channels would be rebranded into CBS Channels. CBS Europa replaced Zone Europa on 3 December 2012 in Poland.

On 1 October 2015 CBS Europa HD has been launched, replacing the SD version on the satellite.

Logos

See also
CBS Reality
CBS Justice
CBS Drama
Paramount International Networks
AMC Networks International
RTL CBS Extreme
RTL CBS Entertainment

References

External links
Official site

AMC Networks International
Paramount International Networks
Television channels and stations established in 1998
Television channels in Poland